Union Hotel, also known as Shepherdstown Hotel, is a historic hotel located at Shepherdstown in Cumberland County, Pennsylvania. It was built in 1860, and consists of a three-story, eight bay, rectangular brick main section in the Georgian style. It measures 56 feet, 6 inches wide by 33 feet deep.  It has a brick ell, also dated to about 1860, and a 1 1/2-story frame summer kitchen.  A one-story frame addition was built about 1920.  The building was restored in the 1980s.

It was listed on the National Register of Historic Places in 1989.

References 

Hotel buildings on the National Register of Historic Places in Pennsylvania
Georgian architecture in Pennsylvania
Hotel buildings completed in 1860
Buildings and structures in Cumberland County, Pennsylvania
National Register of Historic Places in Cumberland County, Pennsylvania